Knock On Wood is an acoustic album by The Young Gods.

CD track listing
 Our House 	 
 I'm The Drug 	 
 Everythere 
 Gasoline Man 	 
 Speak Low  (Nash/Weill) 	 
 Charlotte 	 
 Ghost Rider (Suicide) 	 
 Longue Route 	 
 She Rains 	 
 Freedom (Richie Havens) 
 Skinflowers

DVD Track listing
Live At Moods
 I'm The Drug
 Gasoline Man
 Speak Low
 Ghost Rider
 Longue Route
 She Rains
 Everything In Its Right Place (Radiohead)
 If Six Was Nine (Jimi Hendrix)
Take Away Shows
 Charlotte
 I'm The Drug
 Gasoline Man

LP Track listing
1A
 Our House (5:38)
 Everythere (4:43)
 Gasoline Man (5:07)
1B
 Speak Low (5:00)
 Charlotte (2:07)
 Longue Route (4:22)
 She Rains (5:28)
2A
 Skinflowers (4:20)
 I'm The Drug (2:55)
 Freedom (4:03)
 Stay With Us (4:20)
2B
 Ghostrider (12:02)

Credits
Main Performer
Franz Treichler - Guitar, percussion, vocals/
Al Comet - Guitar, percussion/
Bernard Trontin -  drums, percussion/

Additional personnel
 Vincent Hänni - Guitar

The Young Gods albums
2008 live albums
2008 video albums
Live video albums
PIAS Recordings live albums
PIAS Recordings video albums